The Benelli MP 95E or Benelli MP95 Atlanta is a precision target shooting pistol designed for the 25 metre pistol and 25 metre rapid fire pistol ISSF shooting events. It is manufactured by Benelli Armi SpA of Italy. Available calibers are .22 LR and .32 S&W Long Wadcutter.

Features
Like all pistols designed for the 25 metre pistol and 25 metre rapid fire pistol events, it has fully adjustable sights, trigger and anatomically shaped grip.

It lacks the palm shelf of the older MP90, but one can be added as an option. The top of the pistol features numerous rails for the mounting of a scope or electronic sight.

See also
 Benelli MP 90S

References

External links
 Official homepage - Italy
 Official homepage - USA

Benelli semi-automatic pistols
.22 LR pistols